The Rønne Stadion Nord is a multi-use Stadium in Bornholm, Denmark. The stadium serves the Bornholm national football team and several local sports teams. It holds about 6,000 people.

External links 
 Picture of Rønne Stadion Nord (In Danish)

Football venues in Denmark